Taiwan, officially the Republic of China, is a country in East Asia.

Taiwan or Tai Wan may also refer to:

Places
 Taiwan (island), the main island of Taiwan, known alternately as Formosa
 Taiwan Province, a nominal administrative division covering much of Taiwan and the Penghu Islands
 Taiwan Prefecture, a prefecture of Taiwan during the Qing dynasty
 "Taiwan, China", a political propaganda term used by China's Communist government to claim Taiwan as part of its territory

In Hong Kong
 Tai Wan, Hung Hom, an area of Hong Kong and a former bay 
Tai Wan Road
 Tai Wan, a beach at Tai Long Wan (Sai Kung District), Hong Kong
 Tai Wan, a bay and village on the island of Po Toi
 Tai Wan Village, Lamma Island, a village on Lamma Island, Hong Kong
 Tai Wan Village, Sai Kung District, a village in Sai Kung District, Hong Kong

People 
 Taiwan Jones, an American football running back
 Taiwan Jones (linebacker), an American football linebacker

Other uses
 2169 Taiwan, an asteroid

See also
 
 Taiwanfu (disambiguation)
 Formosa (disambiguation)
 Republic of China (disambiguation)
 ROC (disambiguation)
 China (disambiguation)
 Taiwan Province (disambiguation)